Lioptilodes prometopa is a species of moth in the genus Lioptilodes known from Peru. Moths of this species take flight in May, June and December and have a wingspan of approximately 27–30 millimetres.

References

Platyptiliini
Moths described in 1909